The 1931 Utah State Aggies football team was an American football team that represented Utah State Agricultural College in the Rocky Mountain Conference (RMC) during the 1931 college football season. In their 13th season under head coach Dick Romney, the Aggies compiled a 6–2 record (5–2 against RMC opponents), finished second in the conference, and outscored all opponents by a total of 147 to 72.

Center John Vranes and halfback Delbert Young received first-team all-conference honors in 1931.

Schedule

References

Utah State
Utah State Aggies football seasons
Utah State Aggies football